Richland Municipal Airport  is a city-owned, public-use airport located one mile (2 km) north of the central business district of Richland, a city in Pulaski County, Missouri, United States.

Facilities and aircraft 
For the 12-month period ending June 13, 2007, the airport had 520 aircraft operations, an average of 43 per month: 90% general aviation and 10% military.

References

External links 

Airports in Missouri
Buildings and structures in Pulaski County, Missouri